David Deveau (born 1953) is an American classical pianist. Born in Concord, Massachusetts, he has appeared as soloist with the Boston Symphony and Boston Pops Orchestras, the San Francisco, Pittsburgh, St. Louis, Minnesota, Houston, Miami, Pacific and Portland Symphony Orchestras.

References
 

1953 births
Living people
People from Concord, Massachusetts
American classical pianists
American male classical pianists
20th-century American pianists
21st-century classical pianists
20th-century American male musicians
21st-century American male musicians
21st-century American pianists